Mike Demicco (born November 1, 1958) is an American politician who has served in the Connecticut House of Representatives from the 21st district since 2013.

References

1958 births
Living people
Democratic Party members of the Connecticut House of Representatives
21st-century American politicians